Al Qurayyah is a small village situated in western Bahrain.  It lies west of Saar, north of the village of Jasra, and to the south of Bani Jamra. The village is host to multiple compounds housing expatriate workers.

References

Populated places in the Northern Governorate, Bahrain